Nicholas Tucker is an English academic and writer who is an honorary Senior Lecturer in Cultural Studies at the University of Sussex.

He was educated at Burgess Hill School in Hampstead, London, where his English teacher was briefly Bernice Rubens. A former teacher and then an educational psychologist, he has had a long association with the Sussex University, having lectured in educational psychology and cultural studies and children's literature at the institution. He was a Senior Lecturer in several of these disciplines.

Tucker is a regular broadcaster and participated in Stop the Week on Radio 4. He contributes to The Guardian, The Independent, the New Statesman, and The Times supplements. He lives in Lewes, East Sussex and has three adult children.

Selected works
 What is a Child? (Fontana, 1977)
 The Child and the Book: Psychological and Literary Exploration (Cambridge U. Press, 1981; 1990) 
 Family Fictions; Contemporary Classics of Children's Literature, with Nikki Gamble (Continuum, 2001)
 The Rough Guide to Children's Books, 0-5 years (Rough Guides, 2002)
 The Rough Guide to Children's Books, 5-11 years (2002)
 Rough Guide to Books for Teenagers, with Julia Eccleshare (2003)
 Darkness Visible: Inside the World of Philip Pullman (Wizard Books, 2003)

As editor:
 Suitable for Children?: Controversies in Children's Literature (Chatto and Windus, 1976)
 Children's Book Publishing in Britain Since 1945, co-editor Kimberley Reynolds  (Scolar Press, 1998)

References

External links 

 
 Nicholas Tucker at The Guardian

Children's literature criticism
Living people
Year of birth missing (living people)
Educational psychologists
English psychologists
Schoolteachers from London
Academics of the University of Sussex